Clayton Gerein (May 24, 1964 – January 22, 2010) was a Canadian wheelchair athlete, who won 14 medals in racing events at the Paralympic Games between 1984 and 2008.

Born and raised in North Battleford, Saskatchewan, While training racehorses, Gerein's neck broke in 1982  He first competed as a swimmer at the 1984 Paralympics in Los Angeles, but subsequently had his greatest success competing in racing events, winning seven gold, four silver and three bronze medals during his racing career. He retired from competitive racing after the 2008 Paralympics. Clayton lived in Pilot Butte, Saskatchewan for a long part of his lifetime and career and was seen all around town practicing.

Clayton also coached and mentored Paralympic Champion Lisa Franks, after he met her while she was in the hospital recovering from a spinal cord injury.

Gerein was named SaskSport's male athlete of the year in 1987, 1996 and 2001.

Gerein died from a brain tumour in Regina on January 22, 2010. He was 45.

References

1964 births
2010 deaths
Deaths from cancer in Saskatchewan
Neurological disease deaths in Saskatchewan
Deaths from brain tumor
Olympic wheelchair racers of Canada
Sportspeople from North Battleford
Sportspeople from Saskatchewan
Swimmers at the 1984 Summer Paralympics
Athletes (track and field) at the 1988 Summer Paralympics
Athletes (track and field) at the 1992 Summer Paralympics
Athletes (track and field) at the 1996 Summer Paralympics
Athletes (track and field) at the 2000 Summer Paralympics
Athletes (track and field) at the 2004 Summer Paralympics
Athletes (track and field) at the 2008 Summer Paralympics
Canadian male wheelchair racers
Paralympic wheelchair racers
People with paraplegia
Medalists at the 1988 Summer Paralympics
Medalists at the 1992 Summer Paralympics
Medalists at the 1996 Summer Paralympics
Medalists at the 2000 Summer Paralympics
Medalists at the 2004 Summer Paralympics
Paralympic gold medalists for Canada
Paralympic silver medalists for Canada
Paralympic bronze medalists for Canada
Paralympic medalists in athletics (track and field)
Paralympic track and field athletes of Canada
Medalists at the World Para Athletics Championships